Nikah is a 1998 Pakistani romantic drama film and a remake of the 1977 film Aina. The film is directed by Sangeeta and produced by Shahzad Rafique. Reema won the Best Actress Nigar Award for her role in the movie.

Synopsis
The story is about two different social classes; Shaan belongs to a middle-class family with great traditional values and Reema is from a rich family. The film portrayed the difficulties of a rich girl adjusting to the life of a middle-class family.

Reception
The film was released in 1998. The film was a huge success, and celebrated its Platinum Jubilee at the Pakistani cinemas.

Cast
 Reema
 Shaan
 Nirma
 Ahsan Khan
 Goshi Khan
 Laila 
 Deeba
 Abid Khan
 Mishi Khan
 Nazo 
 Riffat Tajalli
 Tamanna

Soundtrack 
 GT Road Tay Braikan Laggian Sung by Abrar-ul-Haq
 Yeh Dil Hay Deevana Teray Pyar Ka Sung by Akhlaq Ahmed

All music is composed by M. Arshad and film song lyrics are by Saeed Gillani, Riaz ur Rehman Saghar and Abrar-ul-Haq.

Awards
 Nigar Award for Best Film (1998)
 Nigar Award for Best Actor (1998)
 Nigar Award for Best Actress (1998)
 Nigar Award for Best Film Director

References

External links

1990s Urdu-language films
Pakistani romantic drama films
1998 films
Urdu-language Pakistani films
Remakes of Pakistani films
Nigar Award winners
Films directed by Sangeeta (Pakistani actress)